Jamestown High School is a public secondary school at 3751 John Tyler Highway in James City County, Virginia, just outside Williamsburg, Virginia. The school opened in 1997, becoming the second of three high schools in the county. It is part of Williamsburg-James City County Public Schools. As of 2013 it had 1,211 students.

History
Jamestown High School opened in 1997, with the first student body consisting of Lafayette High School students and various local middle school graduates. Its name derives from the nearby Jamestown Settlement. In 2007 Jamestown High School was replaced as the newest school within the district by Warhill High School, which was built to relieve overcrowding. Some students from Jamestown, Lafayette High School and local middle schools made up the first student body there.

Curriculum
The curriculum is based on standards set by the Virginia Board of Education.  Jamestown participates in the AVID program to facilitate preparation for college. Jamestown offers 19 Advanced Placement classes. These include Biology, Calculus  AB & BC, Chemistry, English Language, English Literature, French, German, Human Geography, Latin, Microeconomics, Music Theory, Physics 1 & 2, Psychology, Spanish, Studio Art, US Government, and US History. Students can also take additional AP classes online via Virtual Virginia.

Graduation requirements at Jamestown include three credits of mathematics and science; four credits of English; four credits of history; and one credit of a foreign language (Spanish, German, French, Latin or American Sign Language).  Finally, students must complete one technology credit and one fine arts credit.

In addition to the basic diploma, an advanced diploma option is available. Requirements for the advanced diploma include additional foreign language credits.

Jamestown offers enrollment at The New Horizons Governor's School for Science and Technology. The Governor's School is a two-year, half-day program for 11th and 12th graders. Admission to the program is highly competitive. Students select either the engineering strand, the biological science strand, or the scientific programming strand.

Culture
In 1999, the school received various bomb threats after the Columbine High School shootings. This has not occurred in recent years. In 2007 a student was apprehended with a small handgun, apparently in an attempt to scare another student into returning a PSP that was stolen from him.

Some incidents related to drug and alcohol usage have resulted in disciplinary action, especially during prom and homecoming weeks. A program called "Every 30 Minutes", which simulates a car accident that occurs after drinking alcohol, attempts to deter students from drinking.

Campus

The first floor contains classrooms for fine arts, technology (split into engineering, graphics and Cooperative Business Education), math and science. The special education classrooms are also on this level. The second floor has the library (or media center) and classrooms for math, social studies, English and foreign languages (along with English as a Second Language (ESL)).

West of the main building, five trailers that acted as 10 classrooms and could hold around a total of 250 students were brought in to relieve overcrowding. In spite of the reduction in enrollment due to the construction of Warhill High School, two of the trailers have become a permanent part of the campus. The school is surrounded by wooded and swamp areas.

Enrollment

[*] A new high school opened this year.  Students were redistricted.

Teacher statistics

Full-time- 74 (2012-2013)
Student/Teacher Ratio= 16:4

Demographics
As of the 2012-2013 school year, Jamestown High School's student body is  74% (898) White; 11.5% (139) Black; 7% (90) Hispanic; 3% (31) Asian; and 1% (3) Native American.

Athletics

The school's mascot is an eagle and its sports teams currently play in the AA Bay Rivers District in Region I. Jamestown has won 23 state titles, which include six AA girls' tennis Dynasty state titles from 2000–2002, 2004–2006; five boys' swimming state titles in 2001 and 2006–2008 and 2016; seven AA girls' swimming titles from 2000 to 2002 as well as 2013 to 2017; four AA boys' soccer titles in 2001, 2008, 2012, and 2015; one AA girls' soccer title in 1999; six AA golf titles in 1999, 2013, and 2014,2015, 2016, and 2018; one girls' field hockey title in 2001; one AA boys' cross country title in 2001; and one AA girls' basketball title in 2006.
Jamestown also had their first female football player during the 2000-2001 season.

Theatre
The Jamestown High School Theatre Department formed in September 1997. Traditionally it produces three shows every year. There is a fall one-act, a fall play and a spring musical. Jamestown has competed in the Virginia High School League (VHSL) One-Act competitions at the district, regional, and state level. Its production of Degas C'est Moi won all three VHSL Championships.

Music
Jamestown has several musical groups, including a symphonic band and wind ensemble, a marching band and mixed, jazz and chamber choirs.

Band
The band has won a superior rating every year after its founding year and has traveled to numerous destinations across the US for competition.

Marching band
The marching band is by far the largest musical group at Jamestown.  The instrumentation consists of woodwinds, brass, a drum line and a pit (usually keyboard instruments and axillary instruments).  There is also a color guard that twirls colorful flags, dance, and use other visuals as the school board does not allow the use of rifles or sabers in performances.  The band uses a technique very similar to modern style drum and bugle corps.

Clubs and extracurricular activities
Jamestown has several different clubs and groups.  In order for the group to be part of the school, it must first have at least one sponsor and it must have approval by the principal.

Here is a list of all of the clubs and organizations, as listed on the school's website:
Academic Team,
AFS Intercultural Programs,
Art Club,
Color Guard (part of the marching band),
Dance Team,
DECA,
Eagle Eye Newspaper,
Ecology Club,
Envirothon Club,
French Club,
Freshman Class,
Future Business Leaders of America (FBLA),
German Club,
It's Academic,
Jamestown Robotics Club,
Junior Class,
Key Club,
Lacrosse (at JHS lacrosse is considered a club, not a sport),
Latin Club,
Ascent,
Math League,
Model United Nations (Model U.N.),
National Honor Society (NHS),
Parent Teacher Student Association (PTSA),
Peer Mediation,
Peer Partners,
Science Club,
Senior Class,
Sophomore Class,
Spanish Club,
Spanish National Honor Society,
Students Academic Recognition (STAR),
Student Cooperative Association (SCA),
Theatre Programs,
Vocational Industrial Clubs of America (VICA), and
Yearbook.

Ascent
Ascent is the literature and art magazine at Jamestown. It was originally established as Labyrinth.

References

Educational institutions established in 1997
Public high schools in Virginia
Schools in James City County, Virginia
Education in Williamsburg, Virginia
1997 establishments in Virginia